Van Dongen is a Dutch toponymic surname meaning "from/of Dongen", a town in North Brabant. People with the surname include:

 Cees van Dongen (1932–2011), Dutch motorcycle racer
 Danny van Dongen (born 1983), Dutch racing driver 
 Dionys van Dongen (1748–1819), Dutch marine and genre painter
 Eef van Dongen (born 1993), Dutch orienteering medalist
 Frits van Dongen (born 1946), Dutch architect
 Frits van Dongen (actor), pseudonym of Hein van der Niet (1901–1975), Dutch actor known in Hollywood as Philip Dorn
 Guus van Dongen née Preitinger (1878–1946), Dutch modern painter, wife of Kees van Dongen
 H. R. Van Dongen (1920–2010), American book cover artist
 Helen van Dongen (1909–2006), Dutch film editor
 Henk van Dongen (1936–2011), Dutch organizational theorist
  (born 1975), Dutch visual artist
 John van Dongen (born 1949), Canadian (British Columbia) politician
 Jolanda van Dongen (born 1966), Dutch racing cyclist
 Kees van Dongen (1877–1968), Dutch Fauvist painter working in France
 Leo van Dongen (1942–2011), Dutch racing cyclist
 Merel van Dongen (born 1993), Dutch football midfielder 
 Renée van Dongen (born 1977), Dutch singer-songwriter known as Charlie Dée
 Peter van Dongen (born 1966), Dutch cartoonist and illustrator
 Wies van Dongen (born 1931), Dutch racing cyclist

See also
Van Donge & De Roo Stadion, football stadium in Rotterdam

References

Dutch-language surnames
Toponymic surnames